The Blacks is a play by the French dramatist Jean Genet. Published in 1958, it was first performed in a production directed by Roger Blin at the Théâtre de Lutèce in Paris, which opened on 28 October 1959. 


Synopsis
A review of the Theatre Royal Stratford East production (2007) states:

In Genet's oeuvre
In a prefatory note, Genet specifies the conditions under which he anticipates the play would be performed, revealing his characteristic concern with the politics and ritual of theatricality:

After The Balcony, The Blacks was the second of Genet's plays to be staged in New York. The production was the longest-running Off-Broadway non-musical of the decade. This 1961 New York production opened on 4 May at the St. Mark's Playhouse and ran for 1,408 performances. It was directed by Gene Frankel, with sets by Kim E. Swados, music by Charles Gross, and costumes and masks by Patricia Zipprodt. The original cast featured James Earl Jones as Deodatus, Roscoe Lee Browne as Archibald, Louis Gossett Jr., as Edgar Alas Newport News, Cicely Tyson as Stephanie, Godfrey Cambridge as Diouf, Jay J. Riley as the Governor, Cynthia Belgrave as Adelaide Bobo, Ethel Ayler as Augusta Snow, Helen Martin as Felicity Trollop Pardon, Raymond St. Jacques as Judge, Maya Angelou as the White Queen and Charles Gordone as the burglar.

Shi Mei Li directed the play in 1983.

See also
Theater of the Absurd
Whiteface (performance)
Les Blancs

References

Further reading
 Bradby, David. 1998. "Genet, Jean." In The Cambridge Guide to Theatre. Ed. Martin Banham. Cambridge: Cambridge University Press. 417. .
 Genet, Jean. 1960. The Blacks:. Trans. Bernard Frechtman. New York: Grove Press. .

External links
 

1959 plays
African and Black nationalism
Plays by Jean Genet
Postcolonialism
Off-Broadway plays